Zavalla may refer to:
 Zavalla, Santa Fe, Argentina
 Zavalla, Texas, United States